Wassall is a surname. Notable people with the surname include:

Darren Wassall (born 1968), English football player and coach
Jackie Wassall (1917–1994), English football player
Samuel Wassall (1856–1927), British Army personnel